The huachicol or guachicol is an adulterated alcoholic beverage. The Mexican Spanish word is also used to name the fuel (gasoline or diesel) adulterated or stolen. People who engage in the illegal activity of stealing and adulterating fuel and alcoholic beverages in Mexico are known as huachicoleros.

Etymology
According to the studies of Arturo Ortega Morán, a Mexican writer specialized in the origin of the words and expressions of Castilian, the word huachicol comes from the Latin word "aquati", which means watered down. During the sixteenth century the term aquati referred to a technique used in painting, which consists in diluting the pigments in water. When this word was used in France it became "gouache" retaining its meaning. Later, when the name of this technique arrived in Mexico during the 19th century, I used to refer to it as "painting the guach".

At that time the tequila and brandy vendors who diluted the drinks with water to obtain more profits, they began to be named with the appellation of guachicolero or huachicolero. Similarly, they began to be called fuel traders who lowered their gasoline or oil with water to achieve better profits. Currently the word huachicolero is used to denote a person dedicated to theft, illegal transfer and sale of hydrocarbons.

It could also derive from the Tlachiqueros, people in charge of scraping the maguey and then extracting the mead.

Preparation and use of the drink
For its preparation, the huachicoleros went through a sieve the "mojadito", cubic sugar or caramel that stuck in the pipes, added cane alcohol, lit it and distilled it in a container; either with cinnamon tea, orange peels, plums from Spain or simple water and they drank it (Gastélum 1992).

In the preparation of the huachicol, methanol is produced because the diversity of the added ingredients and its artisanal process do not guarantee a stable temperature for its proper distillation. The consumption of these adulterated drinks causes headaches, tremors, blindness due to optic nerve damage and death in different degrees (WHO ICD-10 2010).

Stolen fuel for cars
The adulterated fuel is diluted with different substances to achieve greater financial benefit when sold and can cause damage to the cars in which it is used.

References 

Mexican alcoholic drinks